During the 2003–04 English football season, Gillingham F.C. competed in the First Division.

Season summary
Gillingham achieved First Division survival by the narrowest of margins - a goal difference one goal better than 22nd-placed Walsall.

Players

First-team squad
Squad at end of season

Left club during season

References

Notes

Gillingham F.C. seasons
Gillingham